Behind the Mask is the fifteenth studio album by British-American rock band Fleetwood Mac, released on 9 April 1990. It was the first album released by the band after the departure of guitarist Lindsey Buckingham (although he did play acoustic guitar on the album's title track). He was replaced by Billy Burnette and Rick Vito, both guitar players, singers and songwriters. Fleetwood Mac thus became a six-piece band with four singer/songwriters. The album was not as successful as its predecessor, Tango in the Night, nor did it spawn any big hit singles, although "Save Me" made both American and Canadian Top 40, while "Love Is Dangerous" and "Skies the Limit" enjoyed some airplay. Though Behind the Mask barely reached the US Top 20, the album entered the UK Albums Chart at number 1 and achieved platinum status there. Following the album's release and subsequent world tour, band members Stevie Nicks and Rick Vito left the band, though Nicks would rejoin in 1997.

The cover for the album was created by photographer Dave Gorton. He stated that the band did not wish to appear on a front picture and Mick Fleetwood himself suggested that he create an image that "spiritually symbolised" the band instead. The cover earned a Grammy nomination in 1991 for "Best Album Package".

"Stand On the Rock" would be covered a year later by popular CCM group The Imperials on their album Big God with Jonathan Pierce on lead vocals.

The song "Freedom" was written by Stevie Nicks with Tom Petty and the Heartbreakers guitarist Mike Campbell. Campbell would join Fleetwood Mac in 2018.

The original CD release for the album was one of the first to be encoded with the CD+G format, which allows graphics to be shown on a TV screen in time with the music, such as pictures and lyrics.

Background
In 1987, shortly after the release of Tango in the Night, long-time guitarist/vocalist/producer Lindsey Buckingham had left the band. For the accompanying tour, the band recruited Billy Burnette and Rick Vito to replace him. Once the tour wrapped up, Fleetwood Mac went into the studio to record two new songs for their Greatest Hits compilation album, released in 1988. The new members got the opportunity to record a full album in 1989 when the band began the Behind the Mask sessions.

In need of a new producer, the band hired Greg Ladanyi, who had worked on some of Don Henley's solo albums. Although Buckingham did play acoustic guitar on the title track, Behind the Mask deviated from the ornate production found on earlier Fleetwood Mac albums in favor of adult oriented rock. As noted by Nicks, the album was easier to record compared to their other work. "It's not that we didn't take as much time, it's more that the time that we did take was quality time. So it therefore did not seem to take nearly as long."

Critical reception

The album received very mixed to negative reviews. AllMusic  retrospectively gave the album 1.5/5 stars, their lowest rating of any Fleetwood Mac album, calling Buckingham's departure "a severe blow" for the band and saying that "the songs are among the least inspired the band ever recorded." Other critics, however, praised the new line-up. The Los Angeles Times gave the album 3.5/5 stars, commenting that "[w]ithout Buckingham's obsessively unique vision, the group has embraced an all-for-one, one-for-all attitude for what sounds like the most truly group effort since Rumours, or perhaps even since 1972's Bare Trees." Rolling Stone rated it as 4/5 stars, claiming that "the addition of Rick Vito and Billy Burnette is the best thing to ever happen to Fleetwood Mac" and that "[n]ot since Rumours has Fleetwood Mac recorded pain so unwaveringly and sounded this together."

Track listing

Personnel 
Fleetwood Mac
 Stevie Nicks – vocals
 Christine McVie – vocals, keyboards
 Rick Vito – lead guitars, vocals
 Billy Burnette – guitars, vocals
 John McVie – bass guitar
 Mick Fleetwood – drums, percussion, spoken word on "In the Back of My Mind"

Additional musicians
 Stephen Croes – keyboards, Synclavier programming
 Dan Garfield – keyboard programming 
 Lindsey Buckingham – acoustic guitar on "Behind the Mask"
 Okyerema Asanté – percussion on "Freedom"

Production
 Fleetwood Mac – producers
 Greg Ladanyi – producer, engineer, mixing 
 Tim McCarthy – assistant producer 
 Bob Levy – engineer 
 Dennis Mays – engineer 
 Craig Porteils – assistant engineer 
 Duane Seykora – assistant engineer 
 Brett Swain – assistant engineer 
 Paula Wolak – assistant engineer 
 Stephen Marcussen – mastering at Precision Lacquer (Hollywood, California)
 John Courage – studio coordinator 
 Dennis Dunstan – studio coordinator
 Steve Dikun – guitar technician 
 Michael Randolph Reed – drum technician 
 Dave Gorton – cover photography 
 Jeri Heiden – art direction

Charts

Weekly charts

Year-end charts

Certifications

References

Fleetwood Mac albums
1990 albums
Albums produced by Greg Ladanyi
Warner Records albums
Albums produced by John McVie
Albums produced by Mick Fleetwood
Albums produced by Christine McVie